Richard William Richards (14 February 1890 – 29 January 1934) was a Welsh footballer who played in various forward positions in the Football League for Wolverhampton Wanderers, West Ham United and Fulham, and internationally for Wales.

Career

Richards was born in Glyn Ceiriog and played non-league football for Bronygarth, Chirk and Oswestry United before moving to Wolverhampton Wanderers.

During his time at Wolves, Richards played 88 League games either side of World War I, scoring 22 goals. He gained five caps for Wales while with the club, scoring in a 2–1 win against England during the 1919–20 British Home Championship.

He joined West Ham United in 1922 for a fee of £300. Initially joining as an outside-left, he was moved to the opposite flank to accommodate Jimmy Ruffell. The 1922–23 season saw Richards make 34 Second Division appearances. He also made 10 cup appearances for the club, including the 1923 FA Cup Final loss to Bolton Wanderers. The following season, after promotion to the First Division, Richards made a further ten appearances, including a single FA Cup appearance that saw the Hammers bow out of the competition to Second Division Leeds United. Richards picked up more international caps, playing at inside-left, at the 1923–24 British Home Championship, which saw victories for Wales against all three other teams.

In 1924, after 53 appearances for West Ham, Richards left for Fulham. He made 24 appearances for the west London club, scoring twice, but his time there was hampered by injury. He went on to play for Welsh teams, Mold, where he gained the last of 9 caps, and Colwyn Bay United, where he finished his career. He then went to work for an electricity company in Cheshire. During this time, he sustained a back injury which led to his death, at the age of 42.

Notes

References

1890 births
1934 deaths
Welsh footballers
Wales international footballers
Association football forwards
English Football League players
Chirk AAA F.C. players
Oswestry United F.C. players
Wolverhampton Wanderers F.C. players
West Ham United F.C. players
Fulham F.C. players
Colwyn Bay F.C. players
FA Cup Final players
Industrial accident deaths